Henry Pheloung (born Michael Henry Phelan; 1852–1909) was a New Zealand bandsman, labourer and carrier. He was born in Swansea, Glamorganshire, Wales in about 1852.

References

1852 births
1909 deaths
New Zealand musicians
People from Swansea
Welsh emigrants to New Zealand